Matt Devlin (born 1969) is a play-by-play TV announcer currently employed mainly by the Toronto Raptors of the NBA, having replaced Chuck Swirsky in 2008. His current on-air colour commentator partners are Alvin Williams and Jack Armstrong.

Broadcasting career
Devlin started with NBA TV during its first season in 1999. He then spent three years (2001-2004) as the lead play-by-play voice of the NBA's Memphis Grizzlies, and three years for the Charlotte Bobcats. He has also done play-by-play for the NBA on TNT and football and men's college basketball for Big Ten Network. For many years, he has provided commentary during the NBA Playoffs in the early rounds of the Western Conference. Also working for the NFL on FOX for play by play.

Devlin served as the play-by-play man for NBC Sports' coverage of Wrestling at the 2008 Summer Olympics.

In 2008, Devlin joined the Toronto Raptors as the team's play-by-play television announcer.

Although employed by the Raptors organization, during the offseason he has occasionally served as a fill-in play-by-play announcer for both of the Raptors' broadcast partners, TSN and Sportsnet. This has included play-by-play for the CFL on TSN and for Sportsnet's coverage of the Rogers Cup (both in 2012), and for Sportsnet's Toronto Blue Jays coverage in 2013, 2014, 2016, 2017 and 2022. In addition, in the fall of 2011, during the NBA lockout, Devlin hosted the pre-game and post-game shows for Toronto Maple Leafs games on Leafs TV. (The Raptors and the Leafs are both owned by Maple Leaf Sports & Entertainment, which in turn is primarily owned by the parent companies of TSN and Sportsnet.)

Devlin is known for his catchphrase of describing 3-point shots as coming not from "downtown" but from the suburbs of Toronto, e.g. "He hits it from Mississauga!", "Drains it from Pickering!", "Banks it in from Burlington!" When Raptors fever swept across Canada during the team's run to the 2019 NBA championship, the shots started coming from the entire country: "From Edmonton!", "From Halifax!", "From Iqaluit!"

Personal life 
A native of Syracuse, New York, Devlin graduated from Boston College with a communication major in 1990. He has three sons, Jack, Ian and Luke, with his wife Erin. Jack Devlin, who has special needs, served as a student manager for the Iowa Hawkeyes men's basketball team from 2018 to 2022. He gained national attention when draining a shot from half-court in his final game at Carver-Hawkeye Arena.

In 2019, Devlin became a Canadian citizen during the Raptors' NBA Finals run.

References

External links

 Raptors.com blog
 MVN.com Hoops Addict audio interview with Matt Devlin
 Dino Nation Blog audio interview with Matt Devlin
 Devlin as Play-By-Play Rogers Cup Tennis Commentator

1969 births
College football announcers
Tennis commentators
Canadian Football League announcers
Olympic Games broadcasters
Living people
American emigrants to Canada
American television sports announcers
Canadian bloggers
Canadian television sportscasters
College basketball announcers in the United States
Memphis Grizzlies announcers
Charlotte Bobcats announcers
National Football League announcers
Naturalized citizens of Canada
Major League Baseball broadcasters
Television personalities from Syracuse, New York
Toronto Raptors announcers
Toronto Blue Jays announcers
Toronto Maple Leafs announcers
Canadian sports announcers
New York Yankees announcers